David John Jenkins (born 2 September 1946) is an English retired professional football forward who played in the Football League, most notably for Arsenal and Tottenham Hotspur.

He joined Arsenal as an apprentice in 1963 and showed promise as a talented winger. He made his senior debut in a 2nd round League Cup replay against Gillingham in September 1966 shortly after turning 20. His league debut came against West Ham United in November 1967, when he came on as a sub for George Graham.

Jenkins played in the 1968 League Cup final, in which he was injured in a collision with Leeds United goalkeeper, Gary Sprake. However, he did not secure a regular place in the Arsenal side until the following season when he made 14 league appearances, scoring three goals, before being swapped in mid-October for Tottenham's winger, Jimmy Robertson.

His final game for Arsenal was against Coventry City on 12 October 1968, when, as it happened, he came off to be replaced by George Graham. He made his debut for Tottenham seven days later against Liverpool.

Both Jenkins and Robertson had limited opportunities at their new clubs and moved on after a couple of seasons, Jenkins to Brentford and Robertson to Ipswich Town.

Career statistics

References

Further reading 
The Spurs Alphabet – A Complete Who's Who of Tottenham Hotspur F.C. (an official Spurs publication) by Bob Goodwin, published by ACL & Polar Publishing (UK) Ltd in 1992, .
David Jenkins, Post War English & Scottish Football League A – Z Player's Transfer Database

1946 births
Living people
Footballers from Bristol
Association football forwards
English footballers
Arsenal F.C. players
Tottenham Hotspur F.C. players
Brentford F.C. players
Hereford United F.C. players
Newport County A.F.C. players
Shrewsbury Town F.C. players
Workington A.F.C. players
English Football League players
Dorchester Town F.C. players
Malvern Town F.C. players
Guisborough Town F.C. players
Durban City F.C. players
English expatriate sportspeople in South Africa
English expatriate footballers
Expatriate soccer players in South Africa
National Football League (South Africa) players